Party of the Iranian Nation (or Nation Party of Iran, Iran Nation Party) is "a small opposition" party in Iran advocating establishment of a secular democracy. Although the party is technically illegal, it still operates inside Iran.

Founded in 1951 by Dariush Forouhar, the party had a few hundred members, mostly high-school students, and was a member of National Front until the Iranian Revolution, however it did not carry much weight in the leadership of the front. The party proposed rebuilding Iran by regaining its lost territories in Bahrain, Afghanistan and Caucasia, and its platform was based on anti-capitalism, anti-communism, anti-monarchism, anti-Semitism, anti-Bahá'ísm and anti-clericalism.

Popular among high school students in Tehran in the 1950s, the party's membership never exceeded a few hundred people.

Electoral history

References

External links 
Official Site 

1951 establishments in Iran
Political parties of the Iranian Revolution
Iranian nationalism
Nationalist parties in Iran
Secularism in Iran
Political parties established in 1951
Banned political parties in Iran
National Front (Iran) affiliated parties
Anti-communist parties
Right-wing parties in Iran